Sammy Voit (born ) is an American actor and television personality. He began his career on Masterchef Junior, Chopped Junior and Food Network Star Kids as himself.  In 2018, he appeared in the film To Dust which won the Grand Jury Audience Award at the Tribeca Film Festival and was nominated in 2020 for Best Screenplay at the Independent Spirit Awards in Los Angeles. He currently stars as young Kevin Jonas in the Happiness Begins Tour and the film Happiness Continues.

Personal life
Voit is from the Bronx, New York. He has an older sister and a younger brother. He is Jewish.

Philanthropy
Voit is an activist for youth homelessness. He fundraises for LA and NYC-based non-profit organizations that support homeless youth. In 2017, Voit started documenting homelessness throughout NY and LA in a film called The Bus Stop. In June 2018, Voit fundraised by catering and donating his Bar Mitzvah gifts to several homeless communities.

In the media
In 2018, Voit was listed by Variety in the Hollywood Youth Impact Report.

Filmography

Film

Television

New Media

Commercial

Music videos

Awards and nominations

References

External links
 

2000s births
Living people
21st-century American male actors
American male child actors
American male film actors
American male television actors
American male stage actors
Jewish American male actors
Male actors from New York City
Entertainers from the Bronx
Homelessness activists
Place of birth missing (living people)
21st-century American Jews